Augusta Anderson (7 November 1875 – 18 December 1951) was a Swedish film actress who appeared in several American films from 1914 to 1937. She was married to Keystone comedian and assistant director Andy Anderson. She was born in Öberga, Sweden and died in Santa Monica, California, U.S.

Selected filmography
Classmates (1914)
The Rainbow Princess (1916)
The Seven Swans (1917)
Rich Man, Poor Man (1918)
Uncle Tom's Cabin (1918)
Come Out of the Kitchen (1919)
The Career of Katherine Bush (1919)
Sinners (1920)
Guilty of Love (1920)
A Romantic Adventuress (1920)
The Blasphemer (1921)

References

External links

1875 births
1937 deaths
Swedish film actresses
Swedish silent film actresses
20th-century Swedish actresses
Swedish emigrants to the United States